In astronomy, an irregular moon, irregular satellite or irregular natural satellite is a natural satellite following a distant, inclined, and often eccentric and retrograde orbit. They have been captured by their parent planet, unlike regular satellites, which formed in orbit around them. Irregular moons have a stable orbit, unlike temporary satellites which often have similarly irregular orbits but will eventually depart. The term does not refer to shape as Triton is a round moon, but is considered irregular due to its orbit.

, 162 irregular moons are known, orbiting all four of the outer planets (Jupiter, Saturn, Uranus and Neptune). The largest of each planet are Himalia of Jupiter, Phoebe of Saturn, Sycorax of Uranus, and Triton of Neptune. It is currently thought that the irregular satellites were captured from heliocentric orbits near their current locations, shortly after the formation of their parent planet. An alternative theory, that they originated further out in the Kuiper belt, is not supported by current observations.

Definition 

There is no widely accepted precise definition of an irregular satellite. Informally, satellites are considered irregular if they are far enough from the planet that the precession of their orbital plane is primarily controlled by the Sun.

In practice, the satellite's semi-major axis is compared with the radius of the planet's Hill sphere (that is, the sphere of its gravitational influence), . Irregular satellites have semi-major axes greater than 0.05  with apoapses extending as far as to 0.65 . The radius of the Hill sphere is given in the adjacent table.

Earth's Moon seems to be an exception: it is not usually listed as an irregular satellite even though its precession is primarily controlled by the Sun and its semi-major axis is greater than 0.05 of the radius of Earth's Hill sphere. On the other hand, Neptune's Triton, which is probably a captured object, is usually listed as irregular despite being within 0.05 of the radius of Neptune's Hill sphere. Neptune's Nereid and Saturn's Iapetus have semi-major axes close to 0.05 of the radius of their parent planets' Hill spheres: Nereid (with a very eccentric orbit) is usually listed as irregular, but not Iapetus.

Orbits

Current distribution 
The orbits of the known irregular satellites are extremely diverse, but there are certain patterns. Retrograde orbits are far more common (83%) than prograde orbits. No satellites are known with orbital inclinations higher than 60° (or smaller than 130° for retrograde satellites). In addition, some groupings can be identified, in which one large satellite shares a similar orbit with a few smaller ones.

Given their distance from the planet, the orbits of the outer satellites are highly perturbed by the Sun and their orbital elements change widely over short intervals. The semi-major axis of Pasiphae, for example, changes as much as 1.5 Gm in two years (single orbit), the inclination around 10°, and the eccentricity as much as 0.4 in 24 years (twice Jupiter's orbit period).
Consequently, mean orbital elements (averaged over time) are used to identify the groupings rather than osculating elements at the given date. (Similarly, the proper orbital elements are used to determine the families of asteroids.)

Origin 

Irregular satellites have been captured from heliocentric orbits. (Indeed, it appears that the irregular moons of the giant planets, the Jovian and Neptunian trojans, and grey Kuiper belt objects have a similar origin.) For this to occur, at least one of three things needs to have happened:
 energy dissipation (e.g. in interaction with the primordial gas cloud)
 a substantial (40%) extension of the planet's Hill sphere in a brief period of time (thousands of years)
 a transfer of energy in a three-body interaction. This could involve:
  a collision (or close encounter) of an incoming body and a satellite, resulting in the incoming body losing energy and being captured.
  a close encounter between an incoming binary object and the planet (or possibly an existing moon), resulting in one component of the binary being captured. Such a route has been suggested as most likely for Triton.

After the capture, some of the satellites could break up leading to groupings of smaller moons following similar orbits. Resonances could further modify the orbits making these groupings less recognizable.

Long-term stability 

The current orbits of the irregular moons are stable, in spite of substantial perturbations near the apocenter.
The cause of this stability in a number of irregulars is the fact that they orbit with a secular or Kozai resonance.

In addition, simulations indicate the following conclusions:
 Orbits with inclinations between 50° and 130° are very unstable: their eccentricity increases quickly resulting in the satellite being lost
 Retrograde orbits are more stable than prograde (stable retrograde orbits can be found further from the planet)
Increasing eccentricity results in smaller pericenters and large apocenters. The satellites enter the zone of the regular (larger) moons and are lost or ejected via collision and close encounters. Alternatively, the increasing perturbations by the Sun at the growing apocenters push them beyond the Hill sphere.

Retrograde satellites can be found further from the planet than prograde ones. Detailed numerical integrations have shown this asymmetry. The limits are a complicated function of the inclination and eccentricity, but in general, prograde orbits with semi-major axes up to 0.47 rH (Hill sphere radius) can be stable, whereas for retrograde orbits stability can extend out to 0.67 rH.

The boundary for the semimajor axis is surprisingly sharp for the prograde satellites. A satellite on a prograde, circular orbit (inclination=0°) placed at 0.5 rH would leave Jupiter in as little as forty years. The effect can be explained by so-called evection resonance. The apocenter of the satellite, where the planet's grip on the moon is at its weakest, gets locked in resonance with the position of the Sun. The effects of the perturbation accumulate at each passage pushing the satellite even further outwards.

The asymmetry between the prograde and retrograde satellites can be explained very intuitively by the Coriolis acceleration in the frame rotating with the planet. For the prograde satellites the acceleration points outward and for the retrograde it points inward, stabilising the satellite.

Temporary captures 

The capture of an asteroid from a heliocentric orbit is not always permanent. According to simulations, temporary satellites should be a common phenomenon.

Physical characteristics

Size 

Because objects of a given size are more difficult to see the greater their distance from Earth, the known irregular satellites of Uranus and Neptune are larger than those of Jupiter and Saturn; smaller ones probably exist but have not yet been observed. Bearing this observational bias in mind, the size distribution of irregular satellites appears to be similar for all four giant planets.

The size distribution of asteroids and many similar populations can be expressed as a power law: there are many more small objects than large ones, and the smaller the size, the more numerous the object. The mathematical relation expressing the number of objects, with a diameter smaller than a particular size, is approximated as:
  with q defining the slope. 
The value of q is determined through observation.

For irregular moons, a shallow power law (q ≃ 2) is observed for sizes of 10 to 100 km,† but a steeper law (q ≃ 3.5) is observed for objects smaller than 10 km. An analysis of images taken by the Canada-France-Hawaii Telescope in 2010 shows that the power law for Jupiter's population of small retrograde satellites, down to a detection limit of ≈ 400 m, is relatively shallow, at q ≃ 2.5. Thus it can be extrapolated that Jupiter should have  moons 400 m in diameter or greater.

For comparison, the distribution of large Kuiper belt objects is much steeper (q ≈ 4). That is, for every object of 1000 km there are a thousand objects with a diameter of 100 km, though it's unknown how far this distribution extends. The size distribution of a population may provide insights into its origin, whether through capture, collision and break-up, or accretion.

†For every object of 100 km, ten objects of 10 km can be found.

Colours 

The colours of irregular satellites can be studied via colour indices: simple measures of differences of the apparent magnitude of an object through blue (B), visible i.e. green-yellow (V), and red (R) filters. The observed colours of the irregular satellites vary from neutral (greyish) to reddish (but not as red as the colours of some Kuiper belt objects).

Each planet's system displays slightly different characteristics. Jupiter's irregulars are grey to slightly red, consistent with C, P and D-type asteroids. Some groups of satellites are observed to display similar colours (see later sections). Saturn's irregulars are slightly redder than those of Jupiter.

The large Uranian irregular satellites (Sycorax and Caliban) are light red, whereas the smaller Prospero and Setebos are grey, as are the Neptunian satellites Nereid and Halimede.

Spectra 
With the current resolution, the visible and near-infrared spectra of most satellites appear featureless. So far, water ice has been inferred on Phoebe and Nereid and features attributed to aqueous alteration were found on Himalia.

Rotation 
Regular satellites are usually tidally locked (that is, their orbit is synchronous with their rotation so that they only show one face toward their parent planet). In contrast, tidal forces on the irregular satellites are negligible given their distance from the planet, and rotation periods in the range of only ten hours have been measured for the biggest moons Himalia, Phoebe, Sycorax, and Nereid (to compare with their orbital periods of hundreds of days). Such rotation rates are in the same range that is typical for asteroids. Triton, being much larger and closer to its parent planet, is tidally locked.

Families with a common origin 
Some irregular satellites appear to orbit in 'groups', in which several satellites share similar orbits. The leading theory is that these objects constitute collisional families, parts of a larger body that broke up.

Dynamic groupings 
Simple collision models can be used to estimate the possible dispersion of the orbital parameters given a velocity impulse Δv. Applying these models to the known orbital parameters makes it possible to estimate the Δv necessary to create the observed dispersion. A Δv of tens of meters per seconds (5–50 m/s) could result from a break-up. Dynamical groupings of irregular satellites can be identified using these criteria and the likelihood of the common origin from a break-up evaluated.

When the dispersion of the orbits is too wide (i.e. it would require Δv in the order of hundreds of m/s)
 either more than one collision must be assumed, i.e. the cluster should be further subdivided into groups
 or significant post-collision changes, for example resulting from resonances, must be postulated.

Colour groupings 
When the colours and spectra of the satellites are known, the homogeneity of these data for all the members of a given grouping is a substantial argument for a common origin. However, lack of precision in the available data often makes it difficult to draw statistically significant conclusions. In addition, the observed colours are not necessarily representative of the bulk composition of the satellite.

Observed groupings

Irregular satellites of Jupiter 

Typically, the following groupings are listed (dynamically tight groups displaying homogenous colours are listed in bold)
 Prograde satellites
 The Himalia group shares an average inclination of 28°. They are confined dynamically (Δv ≈ 150 m/s). They are homogenous at visible wavelengths (having neutral colours similar to those of C-type asteroids) and at near infrared wavelengths
 The prograde satellites Themisto, Carpo, and Valetudo are not part of any known group.

 Retrograde satellites
 The Carme group shares an average inclination of 165°. It is dynamically tight (5 < Δv < 50 m/s). It is very homogenous in colour, each member displaying light red colouring consistent with a D-type asteroid progenitor.
 The Ananke group shares an average inclination of 148°. It shows little dispersion of orbital parameters (15 < Δv < 80 m/s). Ananke itself appears light red but the other group members are grey.
 The Pasiphae group is very dispersed. Pasiphae itself appears to be grey, whereas other members (Callirrhoe, Megaclite) are light red.
Sinope, sometimes included into the Pasiphae group, is red and given the difference in inclination, it could be captured independently.
Pasiphae and Sinope are also trapped in secular resonances with Jupiter.

Irregular satellites of Saturn 

The following groupings are commonly listed for Saturn's satellites:
 Prograde satellites
 The Gallic group shares an average inclination of 34°. Their orbits are dynamically tight (Δv ≈ 50 m/s), and they are light red in colour; the colouring is homogenous at both visible and near infra-red wavelengths.
 The Inuit group shares an average inclination of 46°. Their orbits are widely dispersed (Δv ≈ 350 m/s) but they are physically homogenous, sharing a light red colouring.
 Retrograde satellites
 The Norse group is defined mostly for naming purposes; the orbital parameters are very widely dispersed. Sub-divisions have been investigated, including
 The Phoebe group shares an average inclination of 174°; this sub-group too is widely dispersed, and may be further divided into at least two sub-sub-groups
 The Skathi group is a possible sub-group of the Norse group

Irregular satellites of Uranus and Neptune 

According to current knowledge, the number of irregular satellites orbiting Uranus and Neptune is smaller than that of Jupiter and Saturn. However, it is thought that this is simply a result of observational difficulties due to the greater distance of Uranus and Neptune. The table at right shows the minimum radius (rmin) of satellites that can be detected with current technology, assuming an albedo of 0.04; thus, there are almost certainly small Uranian and Neptunian moons that cannot yet be seen.

Due to the smaller numbers, statistically significant conclusions about the groupings are difficult. A single origin for the retrograde irregulars of Uranus seems unlikely given a dispersion of the orbital parameters that would require high impulse (Δv ≈ 300 km), implying a large diameter of the impactor (395 km), which is incompatible in turn with the size distribution of the fragments. Instead, the existence of two groupings has been speculated:
 Caliban group
 Sycorax group
These two groups are distinct (with 3σ confidence) in their distance from Uranus and in their eccentricity.
However, these groupings are not directly supported by the observed colours: Caliban and Sycorax appear light red, whereas the smaller moons are grey.

For Neptune, a possible common origin of Psamathe and Neso has been noted. Given the similar (grey) colours, it was also suggested that  Halimede could be a fragment of  Nereid. The two satellites have had a very high probability (41%) of collision over the age of the solar system.

Exploration 

To date, the only irregular satellites to have been visited by a spacecraft are Triton and Phoebe, the largest of Neptune's and Saturn's irregulars respectively. Triton was imaged by Voyager 2 in 1989 and Phoebe by the Cassini probe in 2004. Voyager 2 also captured a distant image of Neptune's Nereid in 1989, and Cassini captured a distant, low-resolution image of Jupiter's Himalia in 2000. New Horizons captured low-resolution images of Jupiter's Himalia, Elara, and Callirrhoe in 2007. There are no spacecraft planned to visit any irregular satellites in the future.

Gallery

References

External links 
 David Jewitt's pages
 Discovery circumstances from JPL
 Mean orbital elements from JPL
 MPC: Natural Satellites Ephemeris Service
 Tilmann Denk: Outer Moons of Jupiter and Saturn

 
Moons
Orbits